Jean-Joseph Delvin (1853 – 1922, born in Ghent) was a Belgian painter who specialized in scenes with animals (primarily horses).

Life
He attended the Royal Academy of Fine Arts in Ghent, where he studied under , and worked in the studios of Jean Portaels in Brussels. His fellow students there included André Cluysenaar and Jacques de Lalaing. Later, he undertook study trips to France and Spain. For many years, he shared a small workshop in a garden shed with Gustave Den Duyts.

In 1883, he was invited to join the secessionist group Les XX, along with James Ensor, Fernand Khnopff, Théo van Rysselberghe and several others, but he resigned only a few years later in 1886. He was also a member of La Libre Esthétique and Kunst van Heden (Art for Today) in Antwerp. At about that time, he began teaching at the Academy in Ghent and later became its Director (1902–1913).

Among his many well-known students there were Albert Baertsoen, Gustave De Smet, Frans Masereel, George Minne and Frits Van den Berghe.

Gallery

References

Further reading
 Gent. Duizend jaar kunst en cultuur (A Thousand Years of Art and Culture, exhibition catalog), Ghent, (Museum voor Schone Kunsten), 1975.
 Le dictionnaire des peintres belges du XIVe siècle à nos jours, Brussels, 1994.
 Gisèle Ollinger-Zinque, Pierre Baudson, et al., Les XX. La Libre Esthétique. Honderd jaar later (exhibition catalog), Brussels (Royal Museums of Fine Arts of Belgium), 1993.
 De muren weten ervan (The Walls Know It, exhibition catalog), Ghent, 1997.
 M. Tahon-Vanroose, De vrienden van Scribe (The Friends of Scribe, exhibition catalog), Ghent (Museum voor Schone Kunsten), 1998.

External links

 Arcadja Auctions: More works by Delvin

1853 births
1922 deaths
19th-century Belgian painters
19th-century Belgian male artists
20th-century Belgian painters
Animal painters
Artists from Ghent
20th-century Belgian male artists